The Colombia women's national football team has represented Colombia at the FIFA Women's World Cup at two stagings of the tournament, in 2011, 2015.

FIFA Women's World Cup record

Record by opponent

2011 FIFA Women's World Cup

Group C

2015 FIFA Women's World Cup

Group F

Round of 16

2023 FIFA Women's World Cup

Group H

Goalscorers

References

 
Countries at the FIFA Women's World Cup